The P-96 is a Russian 9 mm semi-automatic pistol designed by the KBP Instrument Design Bureau for the Russian Armed Forces. The pistol was not accepted and then offered in a modernized form for law enforcement and security firms (P-96M and P-96S).

Variants 
 P-96 (П-96 "Эфа") - 9×19mm Parabellum version. First pistol was made in 1996.
 P-96S (П-96С) - 9×17mm version. First pistol was made in 1996, the production began in October 1998. It is used in Ministry of Internal Affairs, postal security guards and private security companies.
 P-96M (П-96М) - 9×18mm version. The production began in 2000. It is used in law enforcement. In 2005, 9 mm pistol P-96M and 9x18 mm armor-piercing pistol cartridge 7N25 by decision of the Government of the Russian Federation were adopted by the Ministry of Internal Affairs of the Russian Federation.
 PTT (ПТТ) -  a prototype, 9mm non-lethal pistol (version of P-96S chambered for the non-lethal 9mm P.A. ammunition with rubber bullets).

Museum exhibits 
 one P-96S pistol is in collection of M. T. Kalashnikov Museum in Izhevsk

References

Sources 
 9х18 мм пистолет П-96М. Инструкция по эксплуатации П-96М.00.000 ДЭИ
 9х18 мм пистолет П-96М. Паспорт П-96М.00.000 ПС
 А.Б. Жук. Энциклопедия стрелкового оружия: револьверы, пистолеты, винтовки, пистолеты-пулеметы, автоматы. М., АСТ - Воениздат, 2002. стр.440-441
 Михаил Дегтярёв. П-96С - мал, да удал // журнал "Калашников. Оружие. Боеприпасы. Снаряжение", № 1, 2000

External links
 
 KBP Instrument Design Bureau - official site
 P-96M

.380 ACP semi-automatic pistols
9×18mm Makarov semi-automatic pistols
Semi-automatic pistols of Russia
KBP Instrument Design Bureau products
Military equipment introduced in the 1990s